Poortvliet (Dutch pronunciation: [ˈpoːrtflit]) and van Poortvliet are Dutch surnames that may refer to:
Jack van Poortvliet (born 2001), English rugby union player
Jan Poortvliet (born 1955), Dutch football defender 
Johannes Tak van Poortvliet (1839–1904), Dutch politician
Marie Tak van Poortvliet (1871-1936), Dutch collector and patron of modern art and art critic
Rien Poortvliet (1932–1995), Dutch draughtsman and painter

See also
Poortvliet, a village in the Dutch province of Zeeland

Dutch-language surnames